is a Japanese professional golfer born in Nara.

Career
Taniguchi has won 20 tournaments on the Japan Golf Tour, ranking 10th on the most career victories list; topped the annual earnings list in 2002 and 2007; and is fourth on the career earnings list through 2018. In 2001 he reached the semifinals of the WGC-Accenture Match Play Championship.

He has been in the top 30 of the Official World Golf Ranking, and was the highest ranked Japanese golfer from 2007 to 2008.

Professional wins (22)

Japan Golf Tour wins (20)

*Note: The 2002 Acom International was shortened to 54 holes due to rain.
 The Japan Open Golf Championship is also a Japan major championship.

Japan Golf Tour playoff record (3–4)

Japan PGA Senior Tour wins (2)
2019 Japan Senior Open
2021 Starts Senior Golf Tournament

Results in major championships

CUT = missed the half-way cut
"T" = tied

Summary

Most consecutive cuts made – 2 (2010 U.S. Open – 2010 Open)
Longest streak of top-10s – 0

Results in World Golf Championships

1Cancelled due to 9/11

QF, R16, R32, R64 = Round in which player lost in match play
"T" = tied
NT = No Tournament
Note that the HSBC Champions did not become a WGC event until 2009.

Team appearances
Royal Trophy (representing Asia): 2007, 2009 (winners)
World Cup (representing Japan): 2008

See also
List of golfers with most Japan Golf Tour wins

References

External links

Japanese male golfers
Japan Golf Tour golfers
Sportspeople from Nara Prefecture
1968 births
Living people